Arthur Nelson may refer to:

 Arthur E. Nelson (1892–1955), American lawyer and politician
 Arthur Nelson (footballer) (1909–1977), English footballer
 Arthur Nelson (Australian politician) (1845–1913), New South Wales politician
 Arthur C. Nelson, American urban planner, researcher and academic